Fernando Diego Pellegrino (born 31 March 1986) is an Argentine professional footballer who plays as a goalkeeper for Spanish club CD Tudelano.

Career
Pellegrino began in the youth ranks of River Plate. He failed to make an appearance for River Plate and left in 2008. His spell with the club did include a loan spell to Italian Serie C1 side Salernitana, but, again, he didn't feature. After returning from Salernitana and leaving River Plate, Pellegrino completed a permanent move to Instituto. However, a year later he departed after making just one league appearance. A move to Primera B Nacional club Ferro Carril Oeste followed and he made his league debut on 5 May 2010 in a 0–1 win versus Quilmes. Two further appearances came in 2009–10 for Ferro Carril Oeste.

Later in 2010, Pellegrino spent a season on loan at Argentine Primera División team Gimnasia y Esgrima but didn't play a match. After an unsuccessful spell with Gimnasia, he went back to Ferro before completing a transfer to Atlanta of Primera B Nacional. Twenty-five league appearances followed for Atlanta. On 6 July 2012, Pellegrino joined Defensa y Justicia. His debut for the team came on 11 August against Nueva Chicago. He went on to play ninety league matches for Defensa y Justicia in three seasons, including nineteen in the Primera División after the club won promotion in 2013–14.

Ahead of the 2015 Argentine Primera División season, Pellegrino joined Banfield on loan. Just seven appearances in all competitions came before he returned to his parent club. On 10 January 2016, Pellegrino agreed to join another Primera División team, Arsenal de Sarandí, on loan until 2017. Thirty league appearances followed. In July 2017, Pellegrino joined Primera B Nacional side Sarmiento on loan. He made his Sarmiento debut in a Round of 32 Copa Argentina tie against Sacachispas on 6 September. On 7 August 2018, Huracán completed the loan signing of Pellegrino. He returned in June 2019.

On 5 July 2019, Pellegrino rejoined Huracán for a second loan stint. He featured five times across the following season, with his 200th career appearance arriving on 15 March 2020 during a Copa de la Superliga defeat to Talleres.

After a spell at Mitre, Pellegrino moved to Spain where he in July 2021 signed a one-year deal with Segunda División B side CD Tudelano.

Career statistics
.

References

External links

1986 births
Living people
Footballers from Buenos Aires
Argentine footballers
Argentine expatriate footballers
Association football goalkeepers
Club Atlético River Plate footballers
U.S. Salernitana 1919 players
Instituto footballers
Ferro Carril Oeste footballers
Club de Gimnasia y Esgrima La Plata footballers
Club Atlético Atlanta footballers
Defensa y Justicia footballers
Club Atlético Banfield footballers
Arsenal de Sarandí footballers
Club Atlético Sarmiento footballers
Club Atlético Huracán footballers
Club Atlético Mitre footballers
CD Tudelano footballers
Primera Nacional players
Argentine Primera División players
Segunda División B players
Primera Federación players
Argentine expatriate sportspeople in Italy
Argentine expatriate sportspeople in Spain
Expatriate footballers in Italy
Expatriate footballers in Spain